Denise Dy and Treat Huey were the defending champions and successfully defended their title, defeating Peangtarn Plipuech and Sonchat Ratiwatana in the final, 7–6, 6–4.

Jessy Rompies and Sunu Wahyu Trijati, and Tamarine Tanasugarn and Sanchai Ratiwatana won the bronze medals.

Medalists

Seeds

Draw

Finals

Top half

Bottom half

External links
Draw

Mixed Doubles